The CheiRank is an eigenvector with a maximal real eigenvalue of the Google matrix  constructed for a directed network with the inverted directions of links.  It is similar to the PageRank vector, which ranks the network nodes in average proportionally to a number of incoming links being the maximal eigenvector of the Google matrix   with a given initial direction of links. Due to inversion of link directions the CheiRank ranks the network nodes in average proportionally to a number of outgoing links. Since each node belongs both to CheiRank and PageRank vectors the ranking of information flow on a directed network becomes two-dimensional.

Definition

For a given directed network the Google matrix is constructed in the way described in the article Google matrix. The PageRank vector  is the eigenvector with the maximal real eigenvalue . It was introduced in and is discussed in the article PageRank. In a similar way  the CheiRank is the eigenvector with the maximal real eigenvalue of the matrix  built in the same way as  but using inverted direction of links in the initially given adjacency matrix. Both matrices  and  belong to the class of Perron–Frobenius operators and according to the Perron–Frobenius theorem the CheiRank  and PageRank  eigenvectors have nonnegative components which can be interpreted as probabilities. Thus all  nodes  of the network can be ordered in a decreasing probability order with ranks  for CheiRank and PageRank  respectively. For the World Wide Web (WWW) network the exponent  where  is the exponent for ingoing links distribution. In a similar way the CheiRank probability is in average proportional to the number of outgoing links with 
 with 
 where  is the exponent for outgoing links distribution of the WWW. The CheiRank was introduced for the procedure call network of Linux Kernel software in, the term itself was used in Zhirov. While the PageRank highlights very well known and popular nodes, the CheiRank highlights very communicative nodes.  Top PageRank and CheiRank nodes have certain analogy to authorities and hubs appearing in the HITS algorithm but the HITS is query dependent while the rank probabilities  and  classify all nodes of the network. Since each node belongs both to CheiRank and PageRank we obtain a two-dimensional ranking of network nodes. There had been early studies of PageRank in networks with inverted direction of links but the properties of two-dimensional ranking had not been analyzed in detail.

Examples
An example of nodes distribution in the plane of PageRank and CheiRank is shown in Fig.1 for the procedure call network of Linux Kernel software.

The distribution of these articles in the plane of PageRank and CheiRank is shown in Fig.3 from Zhirov. The difference between PageRank and CheiRank is clearly seen from the names of Wikipedia articles (2009)  with highest rank. At the top of PageRank we have  1.United States, 2.United Kingdom, 3.France while for CheiRank we find 1.Portal:Contents/Outline of knowledge/Geography and places, 2.List of state leaders by year, 3.Portal:Contents/Index/Geography and places. Clearly PageRank selects first articles on a broadly known subject with a large number of ingoing links while CheiRank selects first highly communicative articles with many outgoing links. Since the articles are distributed in 2D they can be ranked in various ways corresponding to projection of 2D set on a line. The horizontal and vertical lines correspond to PageRank and CheiRank, 2DRank combines properties of CheiRank and PageRank as it is discussed in Zhirov. It gives top Wikipedia articles 1.India, 2.Singapore, 3.Pakistan.

The 2D ranking highlights the properties of Wikipedia articles in a new rich and  fruitful manner. According to the PageRank the top 100 personalities described in Wikipedia articles have in 5 main category activities: 58 (politics), 10 (religion),17 (arts), 15 (science), 0 (sport) and thus the importance of politicians is strongly overestimated. The CheiRank gives respectively 15, 1, 52, 16, 16 while for  2DRank one finds 24, 5, 62, 7, 2. Such type of 2D ranking can find useful applications for various complex directed networks including the WWW.

CheiRank and PageRank naturally appear for the world trade network, or international trade, where they and linked with export and import flows for a given country respectively.

Possibilities of development of two-dimensional search engines based on PageRank and CheiRank are considered. Directed networks can be characterized by the correlator between PageRank and CheiRank vectors: in certain networks this correlator is close to zero (e.g. Linux Kernel network) while other networks have large correlator values (e.g. Wikipedia or university networks).

Simple network example

The directed network example with 7 nodes is shown in Fig.4. The matrix , built with the rules described
in the article Google matrix, is shown in Fig.5;
the related Google matrix is 
and the PageRank vector is the right eigenvector of 
with the unit eigenvalue. In a similar way, to determine the CheiRank eigenvector all directions of links in Fig.4 are inverted,
then the matrix  is built,
according to the same rules applied for the network with inverted link
directions, as shown in Fig.6. The related Google matrix is 
 and the CheiRank vector
is the right eigenvector of 
with the unit eigenvalue. Here  is the damping factor taken at its usual value.

See also
 PageRank, HITS algorithm, Google matrix
 Markov chains, Transfer operator, Perron–Frobenius theorem
 Information retrieval
 Web search engines

References

External links
 Two-dimensional ranking of Wikipedia articles
 World trade: CheiRank versus PageRank
 Towards two-dimensional search engines
 Top people of Wikipedia

Link analysis